Hulme Walfield is a civil parish in Cheshire East, England. It contains three buildings that are recorded in the National Heritage List for England as designated listed buildings, all of which are at Grade II. This grade is the lowest of the three gradings given to listed buildings and is applied to "buildings of national importance and special interest". The parish is almost entirely rural, and the listed buildings consist of two farmhouses and a church.

See also

 Listed buildings in Congleton
 Listed buildings in Eaton
 Listed buildings in Marton
 Listed buildings in Somerford
 Listed buildings in Somerford Booths

References
Citations

Sources

 

Listed buildings in the Borough of Cheshire East
Lists of listed buildings in Cheshire